Andrés de Vandelvira (1509–1575) was a Spanish architect, active mainly in Jaén, Uclés, Baeza, and Úbeda during the Renaissance. He was born in Alcaraz, in the province of Albacete and died in Jaén.

The church of Nuestra Señora de la Asunción in Villacarrillo was one of his first works in Jaén. 
Among his most notable works is the Chapel of the Savior in Úbeda, based on a project by Diego de Siloé, and commissioned by Francisco de los Cobos. The Chapel is located on the Vazquez de Molina Square next to the Dean Ortega Palace and the Vázquez de Molina Palace, both designed by Vandelvira. He completed the Chapel of the Benavides in the convent of San Francisco of Baeza. He also helped complete Baeza Cathedral, the Convent of Santo Domingo, La Guardia de Jaén, and the Hospital de Santiago in Úbeda. His masterpiece is considered to be Jaén Cathedral.

One of his sons, Alonso de Vandelvira, published a book on stone-cutting, entitled "Libro de cortes de piedra", in which he disseminated the mountaineering technique or stereotomy, which deals with constructive planning in three dimensions, and which helped to make known in Europe, the extraordinary scientific work of his father

See also
Church of la Santísima Trinidad (Alcaraz)

Further reading 
Chueca Goitia, Fernando (2003): "Jaén y Andrés de Vandelvira" in Boletín del Instituto de Estudios Giennenses (186), pp. 83-91. ISSN 0561-3590
Llaguno y Amirola, Eugenio; Ceán Bermúdez, Juan Agustín (1829): Noticias de los arquitectos y arquitectura de España desde su restauración 2. Madrid: Imprenta Real. pp. 28ff. OCLC 164819831
Galera Andréu, Pedro Antonio (2000): Andrés de Vandelvira. Akal arquitectura. Madrid: Ediciones Akal. . OCLC 469124298
Moreno Mendoza, Arsenio (2005): Úbeda de Vandelvira. Ciudades andaluzas en la historia (1st edn). Sevilla: Fundación José Manuel Lara. . OCLC 63699739
Chueca Goitia, Fernando (1972): Andrés de Vandelvira, arquitecto. Jaén: Instituto de Estudios Giennenses, Patronato José María Quadrado del C.S.I.C. OCLC 8993354
Ruiz Ramos, Francisco Javier (December 2011): La Sacra Capilla de El Salvador de Úbeda. Estudio Histórico-Artístico, Iconográfico e Iconológico. Úbeda: Alfredo Cazabán Laguna. 

Renaissance architects
Spanish Renaissance people
1509 births
1575 deaths
People from the Province of Albacete
16th-century Spanish architects